Francesco Barilli (born 4 February 1943 in Parma) is an Italian actor, film director, screenwriter and painter.

Filmography

References

Footnotes

Sources

External links

1943 births
Living people
20th-century Italian male actors
Italian male film actors
Italian male television actors
Italian film directors
Italian screenwriters
Giallo film directors
Actors from Parma
Italian male screenwriters
Film people from Parma